The Last Just Man is a documentary film that details the events that led to the slaughter of 800,000 people in a 100 days genocide in 1994 in Rwanda. It is dominated by the account of the head of the U.N. peace keeping mission in Rwanda, Brigadier General Romeo Dellaire, a Canadian who bore witness to those atrocities and wished he stopped them. It was directed by Steven Silver.

Awards 

 17th Gemini Awards: Best History Documentary Program
 17th Gemini Awards: Best Direction in a Documentary Program
 17th Gemini Awards: Best Writing in a Documentary Program or Series

Festivals 

 Full Frame Documentary Film Festival
 Chicago International Film Festival
 Film Festival Cologne

References

External links 

 The Last Just Man on IMDb
 The Last Just Man on LetterBoxd

Documentaries about historical events
2002 documentary films
Documentary films about the Rwandan genocide